Events in the year 1813 in Art.

Events
June 21 – Battle of Vitoria: The Marquess of Wellington, as victor, reclaims 83 paintings seized by Joseph Bonaparte from the Spanish Royal Collection which he is allowed to retain.

Awards
Prix de Rome (for sculpture) – James Pradier

Works

Samuel Morse – The Dying Hercules
Johann Christian Reinhart – Blick auf Tivoli
J. M. W. Turner – Frosty Morning
Willem Bartel van der Kool – Piano Practice Interrupted
Richard Westall – Portrait of Lord Byron
David Wilkie
Blind Man's Buff
The Letter of Introduction

Births
January 2 – Eliseo Sala, Italian painter (died 1879)
March 4 – Wijnand Nuijen, Dutch land- and seascape painter (died 1839)
March 27 – Nathaniel Currier, American illustrator (died 1888)
April 2 – Thomas Frank Heaphy, English miniature painter (died 1873)
April 18 – Franz Ittenbach, German religious painter (died 1879)
July 28 – Mathilda Rotkirch, Finnish painter (died 1842)
September 17 – John Jabez Edwin Mayall, English photographer (died 1901)
date unknown
George Hollingsworth, American painter (died 1882)
Gaetano Milanesi, Italian art historian (died 1895)
Frederick Scott Archer, English sculptor and photographic pioneer (died 1857)
probable date – O. G. Rejlander, Swedish-born photographer (died 1875)

Deaths
January 14 – William Marlow, English painter especially of marine scenes (born 1740)
February 5 – William Berczy, Canadian pioneer and painter (born 1744)
March 22 – Gabriel Gotthard Sweidel, Finnish church painter (born 1744)
April 12 – Jean François Carteaux, French painter and army commander (born 1751)
May 31 – Wincenty de Lesseur, Polish portrait painter (born 1745)
June 19 – Johann Christoph Rincklake, German portrait painter (born 1764)
June 20 – Joseph Chinard, French sculptor who worked in a Neoclassical style (born 1756)
June 22 – Anton Graff, Swiss portrait painter (born 1736)
July 29 – Valentine Green, English engraver (born 1739)
 November – Alessandro Longhi, Venetian portrait painter and printmaker in etching (born 1733)
November 29 - Giambattista Bodoni, Italian typographer, type-designer, compositor, printer and publisher (born 1740)
 date unknown
 Anthonie Andriessen, Dutch landscape painter (born 1746)
 Edmund Garvey, Irish painter (born 1740)
 Henry Walton, British painter and art dealer (born 1746)

 
Years of the 19th century in art
1810s in art